Irattai Roja is a 1996 Indian Tamil-language film directed by Keyaar. The film stars Urvashi, Ramki and Khushbu. It is a remake of the Telugu film Subhalagnam (1994). The film was released on 5 April 1996.

Plot

Uma marries Balu, an honest civil engineer. Uma thinks that he is rich and receives a lot of bribes but it turns out, Balu is from a middle-class family like her. Uma is a miser and dreams to become rich. A few years later, they have two children. In the meantime, Priya, the daughter of Balu's boss Rajasekhar, falls in love with Balu and asks him to marry her unaware of Balu's marriage and his two children. Balu refuses to marry her as he was already married but she compels him. When Priya meets Uma, she offers her one crore rupees in exchange for marrying Balu. Uma immediately agrees and she starts forcing Balu for remarriage. Finally, Balu agrees with a heavy heart as Uma threatens to commit suicide. Soon, Balu also starts falling in love with Priya. Uma slowly realizes her mistake and wants to get Balu back. The rest of the story is what happens to Balu, Uma and Priya.

Cast

Urvashi as Uma
Ramki as Balu
Khushbu as Priya
Suhasini Maniratnam as Geetha
Srividya as Lawyer
Vennira Aadai Moorthy as Uma's father
Kavitha as Uma's mother
Rajasekhar as Rajasekhar, Priya's father
Chinni Jayanth
Pandu
Thyagu
Anuja
Shakeela
Sharmili as Girija
M. R. Krishnamurthy
Oru Viral Krishna Rao as Doctor
Junior Balaiah
Swaminathan
Disco Shanti
Ajay Rathnam
Baby Sridevi as Sumathi
Master Prabhu
Visu as an anchor (Guest appearance)

Awards

Won - Cinema Express Award for Best Actress – Tamil - Kushboo
Won - Screen Videocon Award for Best Actress – Tamil - Urvashi

Soundtrack

The film score and the soundtrack were composed by Ilaiyaraaja. The soundtrack, released in 1996, features 5 tracks with lyrics written by Vaali.

References

External links

1996 films
Tamil remakes of Telugu films
Films scored by Ilaiyaraaja
1990s Tamil-language films
Films directed by Keyaar